Ron Nelson (born October 7, 1946) was an American basketball player who played briefly in the original American Basketball Association (ABA). He was drafted 26th overall in the 1968 NBA draft by the Baltimore Bullets, yet decided to return the University of New Mexico for a year to complete his degree and act as an assistant coach.

Nelson played college basketball at New Mexico Military Institute in Roswell, New Mexico and the University of New Mexico. For the two years that Nelson played at New Mexico, they were coined "two of the best teams in school history." In his first season the 1966-67 Lobos rose to third ranked in the nation. Nelson and the late ABA two-time ABA league MVP Mel Daniels made an unbeatable combo.

Nelson's senior season at UNM began with a 17-0 run and resulted in a WAC title and advancing to the NCAA Tournament for the first time in UNM history. He led the team averaging 19.5 points/game. He was then selected as a Helms All-American in addition to being first team All-WAC.He later went on to play for The Floridians of the ABA.  He appeared in 59 games during the 1970–71 season, averaging 3.2 points per game.

References

1946 births
Living people
American men's basketball players
Baltimore Bullets (1963–1973) draft picks
Basketball players from New Mexico
Junior college men's basketball players in the United States
Miami Floridians players
New Mexico Lobos men's basketball players
New Mexico Military Institute alumni
Shooting guards